Loft is a 2005 Japanese horror film directed by Kiyoshi Kurosawa, starring Miki Nakatani and Etsushi Toyokawa.

Plot
Reiko Haruna, a prize-winning writer, moves to a quiet suburban house to finish up her new novel. One night she sees a man in a storage room transporting an object wrapped in cloth. She finds out that he is Makoto Yoshioka, an archaeologist researching ancient mummies, and that object was a recently discovered mummy. Working late on her book, she sees a ghost and finds out that her room once belonged to a woman who disappeared.

Cast
 Miki Nakatani - Reiko Haruna
 Etsushi Toyokawa - Makoto Yoshioka
 Hidetoshi Nishijima - Koichi Kijima
 Yumi Adachi - Aya
 Sawa Suzuki - Megumi Nonomura
 Haruhiko Kato - Murakami
 Ren Osugi - Hino

Reception
Sky Hirschkron of Stylus Magazine gave Loft a "C" grade. However Julien Gester of Les Inrockuptibles titled that the movie had a "disturbing splendor".

References

External links
 
 Review, d-kaz
 Review at Snowblood Apple

2005 horror films
Japanese horror films
Japanese ghost films
Films directed by Kiyoshi Kurosawa
2005 films
2000s Japanese films